Clay Township is one of the fifteen townships of Gallia County, Ohio, United States. As of the 2010 census the population was 1,870.

Geography
Located in the southeastern part of the county along the Ohio River, it borders the following townships:
Gallipolis Township - north
Ohio Township - south
Guyan Township - southwest corner
Harrison Township - west
Green Township - northwest

Mason County, West Virginia, lies across the Ohio River to the east.

It is located downstream of three of the county's five other Ohio River townships.

No municipalities are located in Clay Township.

Name and history
It is one of nine Clay Townships statewide.

Government
The township is governed by a three-member board of trustees, who are elected in November of odd-numbered years to a four-year term beginning on the following January 1. Two are elected in the year after the presidential election and one is elected in the year before it. There is also an elected township fiscal officer, who serves a four-year term beginning on April 1 of the year after the election, which is held in November of the year before the presidential election. Vacancies in the fiscal officership or on the board of trustees are filled by the remaining trustees.

References

External links
County website

Townships in Gallia County, Ohio
Townships in Ohio